Bcl-2-like protein 2 is a 193-amino acid protein that in humans is encoded by the BCL2L2 gene on chromosome 14 (band q11.2-q12). It was originally discovered by Leonie Gibson, Suzanne Cory and colleagues at the Walter and Eliza Hall Institute of Medical Research, who called it Bcl-w.

Function 
This gene encodes a pro-survival (anti-apoptotic) member of the  bcl-2 protein family, and is most similar to Bcl-xL. The proteins of this family form hetero- or homodimers and act as anti- and pro-apoptotic regulators. Expression of this gene in cells has been shown to contribute to reduced cell apoptosis under cytotoxic conditions. Studies of the related gene in mice indicated a role in the survival of NGF- and BDNF-dependent neurons. Mutation and knockout studies of the mouse gene demonstrated an essential role in adult spermatogenesis.

Clinical significance
High levels of Bcl-w are seen in many cancers, including glioblastoma, colorectal cancer, non-small-cell lung carcinoma, and breast cancer. Breast cancer patients with metastasis have higher Bcl-w than breast cancer patients only having primary tumor. Elevated levels of Bcl-w has been shown to protect neurons from cell death induced by amyloid beta. Parkinson's disease patients with a mutant PARK2 gene have elevated Bcl-w. Bcl-w has been shown to contribute to cellular senescence.

Quercetin has been shown to inhibit the PI3K/AKT pathway leading to downregulation of Bcl-w.

Interactions
BCL2L2 has been shown to interact with:
 BCL2L11 
 BAD, and
 PPP1CA.

References

Further reading

External links